Guarayos is a province in the northwestern parts of the Bolivian Santa Cruz Department.

Location 
Guarayos is one of fifteen provinces in the Santa Cruz Department. It borders Beni Department in the north and northwest, Ichilo Province and Obispo Santistevan Province in the southwest, and Ñuflo de Chávez Province in the south and east.

The Province is situated between 13° 58' and 16° 30' south, and 62° 29' and 64° 44' west, its extension from east to west is up to 320 km, from north to west circa 380 km.

Population 
Part of the province is inhabited by an indigenous people, called Guarayos. The current indigenous inhabitants seem to have settled here beginning with the 16th century. The province's population went up from 17,697 (census 1992) to 31,577 (census 2001) and 38,448 (estimation 2005).

Division 
The province consists of three municipalities which are further subdivided into cantons.

See also
 San Jorge Lake

References

External links
Province map
Detailed province map
Population data (Spanish)

Provinces of Santa Cruz Department (Bolivia)